David Harle (born 15 August 1963) is an English former footballer who played in the Football League for Doncaster Rovers, Exeter City, Leeds United, Bristol City, Scunthorpe United and Peterborough United.

He had a short career in non-league football with Goole and Mossley in 1992–93 before he subsequently worked for the Council in Doncaster.

References

External links
 .

English footballers
English Football League players
1963 births
Living people
Doncaster Rovers F.C. players
Exeter City F.C. players
Leeds United F.C. players
Bristol City F.C. players
Scunthorpe United F.C. players
Peterborough United F.C. players
Association football midfielders
Goole A.F.C. players
Mossley A.F.C. players